This is a list of philatelic topics.



A
Acknowledgement of receipt
Adhesive (stamp gum)
Admirals
Aerogram
Aerophilately
Affixing machine
Airmail
Airmail etiquette
Airmail stamp
Alexandria "Blue Boy" Postmaster's Provisional
Arrow block
Asian philately
Astrophilately
Auction (Philatelic)
Awards

B
Balloon mail
Bicycle mail
Bisect
Bogus postal markings
Bogus stamp issue
Booklet
British Guiana 1c magenta
Bulk mail

C
Cachet
Camel mail
Cancellation
Cancelled to order
Caribou mail
Carrier's stamp
Censored mail
Center line block
Certified mail
Charity stamp
Charles Henry Coster
Chinese new year stamps
Christmas seal
Christmas stamp
Cigarette tax stamp
Cinderella stamp
Circular delivery mail
Civil War Patriotic Cacheted Covers
Classic stamp
Coil stamp
Coil waste
Color guide
Color trial
Combination cover
Commemorative stamp
Concentration camp mail

Control mark
Counterfeit stamps
Courier mail
Cover
Crash cover
Crown Agents Philatelic and Security Printing Archive
Cut square

D
Damaged mail
Dead letter mail
Definitive issue
Definitive series
Delayed mail
Design error
Die proof
Diplomatic pouch mail
Dirigible mail
Disinfected mail
Dog mail
Dogsled mail
Dummy stamp

E
Earliest known use (EKU)
Embossing
Engraver's mark
Engraving
Entire
Envelope
Errors and varieties
Errors, freaks, and oddities (EFO)
Essay
Expert
Europa postage stamp
Expertization
Express company
Express mail

F
Famous stamps
Fancy cancel
Favor cancel
Favor sheet
Fee paid mail
Field post office
First day ceremony
First day cover
First day of issue
First flight cover
First issue
Fiscal cancel
Fiscal issue
Flat plate press
Floor sweepings
Forerunner
Forged stamps
Forwarding agent
Fractional currency
Franchise stamp
Franking privilege
Free frank
Fumigated mail

G
Graphite lined stamp
Grill
Guide line
Guide line pair
Gum
Gutter block
Gutter pair

H
Handstruck stamp
Health stamp
Highway post office
History of philately
Hotel post
Hovercraft mail

I
Illegal stamps
Illustration law
Imitation stamp
Imperforate
Imprint block
Imprinted stamp
Postage stamp ink
Inscription
Inscription block
Institutional collection
Insured mail
International mail
International reply coupon
Inverted Jenny
Inverted Swan
Philatelic investment
Irradiated mail
Interrupted mail
- Italian Philatelic Press Association

J
James Chalmers
Joint issue
Joint line
Joint line pair

K
Killer
Kiloware

L
Label
Late fee stamp
Letter carrier
Letterpress
Letter sheet
Line pair
Linn's Stamp News
List of entities that have issued postage stamps
List of most expensive philatelic items
List of notable postage stamps
List of philatelic topics (deliberate self-link)
List of philatelists
List of stamp catalogues
List of stamp collectors
List of stamp dealers
List of United States airmail stamps
Lithography
Local post
Luminescent issue

M
Mail delivery by animal
Mail fraud
Mail robbery
Mailman
Marcophily
Marginal marking
Marine insurance stamp
Maritime mail
Maximaphily
Maximum Card
Metered mail
Michel catalog
Military mail
Millennium stamp
Miniature sheet
Minipack

Mixed franking
Mobile post office
Money order
Mr. Zip

N
Nassau Street (Manhattan)
Naval cover
Naval mail
Navigation and Commerce issue
New issue
Newspaper stamp
Newspaper wrapper
Nicholas F. Seebeck

O
Occupation stamp
Offices abroad
Official mail
Offset printing
Overprint

P
Packet letter
Packet mark
Postage stamp paper
Paquebot
Parcel post
Paste-up pair
Penalty mail
Pen cancel
Penny post
Perfin
Perforation
Perforation gauge
Permit mail
Phantom issue
Philatelic agency
Philatelic cover
Philatelic literature
Philatelic museums
Philately
Philatelic calendar
PHQ Cards
Picture post card
Pigeon mail
Pillar box
Plate block
Plate marking
Plate number coil
Printing plate
Plating
Plebiscite issue
Pneumatic mail

Postage due
Postage stamp booklet
Postage stamp color
Postage stamp reuse
Postage stamp separation
Postal card
Postal convention
Postal history
Postal laws and regulations
Postal marking
Postal route
Postal savings
Postal slogan
Postal stationery
Postal Stationery Society of Great Britain
Postal tax
Postal treaty

Postcard
Post office
Post Office Cards
Post Office circulars
Post road
Precancel
Presentation album
Presentation book
Price list
Postage stamp printing
Postal relation
Prisoner-of-war mail
Private cancellation
Private carrier
Private overprint

Stamp proof
Provisional stamp

R
Railway post office

Ration stamp
Receiving mark
Red Cross label
Registered mail
Regummed stamp
Reissue
Reprint
Remainder
Reperforation
Reply card
Reply coupon
Revenue cancellation
Revenue stamp
Rocket mail
Rotary press
Rouletting
Rowland Hill

S
Savings issue
Scott catalog
Se-tenant
Semi-official
Semi-postal
Separation

Siege mail
Siderography
Slogan cancellation
Socked on the nose (SON)
Souvenir card
Souvenir sheet
Space cover
Space mail
Special delivery
Special handling
Specimen stamp
Stamp album
Stamp catalog
Stamp collecting
Stamp condition
Stamp design
Stamp exhibition
Stamp finder
Stamp gum
Stamp hinge
Stamp mounting
Stamp separation
Stanley Gibbons
Steamship issue
Streetcar mail
Strike mail
Study circle

Surcharge

T
Tax stamp
Telegraph stamp
Test stamp
Tete-beche
Thematic collecting
Tin Can Mail
Topical collecting
Training stamp
Transatlantic mail
Transoceanic mail
Treaty port
Treskilling Yellow

Triptych

U
Unaccepted design
Undeliverable mail
Undesirable issue
Uniform Fourpenny Post
Uniform Penny Post
Universal Postal Union
Untagged
Used abroad

V
Valentine cover

Varnish bars
Stamp vending machine
View card

W
Want list
War cover
War issue

War savings issue
War tax stamp
Watermark
World War II Patriotic Cacheted Covers
Wrapper (philately)
Wreck cover

Y
 Yvert catalog

Z
Z Grill –
Zeppelin mail –
Zip block

Philately
Philatelic topics